Hibernia Beach LIVE was a gay-themed call-in talk radio show broadcast on San Francisco, California rock radio station KITS "Live 105" from October 1989 to 2000. The program was named after "Hibernia Beach" in San Francisco's Castro neighborhood.

According to host Ken McPherson, "Hibernia Beach began because of a fight between GLAAD and the station..."

While it ran, the program was billed as "the longest-running gay-hosted show on commercial radio", and had an audience of over 40,000 listeners as of 1998. It was broadcast weekly from 11:00 p.m. on Sundays until 2:00 a.m. on Monday mornings; airtimes were later pushed back by an hour, to midnight Sunday nights.

On-air hosts included Ken McPherson (jokingly referred to on air as "America's favorite homosexual"), Geraldine Barr, Renée Rotten, and Ben Carlson. The show was initially formatted as a gay and lesbian public affairs program, but later changed to be inclusive of a broader audience; topics included queer issues, politics, music, relationships, and sexuality.

In 1996, the rock band Pansy Division recorded "Hibernia Beach," a new 40-second opening theme song for the program.

References

External links
 Archive of Hibernia Beach Live web page

1989 radio programme debuts
American talk radio programs
LGBT culture in the San Francisco Bay Area
LGBT-related radio programs
LGBT-related mass media in the United States
1980s LGBT-related mass media
1990s LGBT-related mass media